Janet Egyir (born 7 May 1992]) is a Ghanaian footballer who plays as a defender for Israeli Ligat Nashim club Hapoel Katamon Jerusalem FC and the Ghana women's national team. She was part of the team at the 2014 African Women's Championship. In 2018, she was adjudged the best player of the tournament at the 2018 WAFU Women's Cup.

International goals

Club career

Víkingur Ólafsvík 2016

In May 2016 she signed for Víkingur Ólafsvík in Iceland.

Honours
 WAFU Women's Cup player of the tournament : 2018

References

External links 
 
 
 

1992 births
Living people
People from Sekondi-Takoradi
Ghanaian women's footballers
Women's association football defenders
Hasaacas Ladies F.C. players
Ungmennafélagið Víkingur players
Afturelding women's football players
Hapoel Katamon Jerusalem F.C. players
Ghana women's international footballers
Ghanaian expatriate women's footballers
Expatriate women's footballers in Iceland
Ghanaian expatriate sportspeople in Israel
Expatriate women's footballers in Israel
Ghana Women's Premier League players